Savilahti is a surname. Notable people with the surname include:

Eero Savilahti (born 1992), Finnish ice hockey player
Mika Savilahti (born 1963), Finnish sprint canoer

See also
Savilahti Stone Sacristy, Finland